Mouron may refer to:

 Dolpje Mouron (1901–1968), pseudonym "Cassandre", French painter, commercial poster artist, and typeface designer
 Didier Mouron (born 1958), Swiss artist (naturalized Canadian)
 Marie Magdelaine Mouron (1690–96), French soldier
 Vaux-lès-Mouron, commune in the Ardennes department in northern France
 Mouron-sur-Yonne, commune in the Nièvre department in central France